Ariana Barouk (born November 5, 1982) is a model, actress, and singer who represented Cuba in the seventh edition of the environmentally-oriented Miss Earth 2007 international beauty pageant. She was the first Miss Cuba in several decades to compete in a major pageant.

Career
In 2007, she lived in the Philippines where she started a showbusiness career by appearing daily in the game show Eat Bulaga! She then hosted OGAGS on TV5 for over 2 1/2 years. She did many celebrity guest spots and co-hosted for TV stations such as ABS-CBN, GMA, QTV, on their TV shows. She also appeared in reality shows, opening numbers for Wowowee, and hosted local events and parties. She worked with Dolphy and his sons Epy Quizon and Vandolph as a cast member "Lyla" of the weekly show Pidol's Wonderland.

Barouk competed in Miss Earth 2007, which took place on November 11, 2007, at the University of the Philippines Theater in Quezon City, Philippines, won by Jessica Trisko of Canada. The delegates had a special tour in Nha Trang, Vietnam. Eighty-eight delegates competed for the title, including Barouk, who represented Cuba.

She was the first Cuban representative in any international pageant in many decades. Cuba was last represented in Miss Universe in 1967 and in Miss World in 1975; however, both delegates participated by appointment and neither were able to compete. 1959 was the last time a candidate was able to truly compete in Miss Universe.

In the 2007 pageant, Barouk won the "Miss Eco-Tourism" special award, placed top in "Long Gown" and was among the top favorites to win the crown. This made TAPE, Inc., producer of Eat Bulaga, noticed her and hired her as a co-host of the show. She stayed in Manila, Philippines, to live and pursued a showbiz career, where she was then hired as host on OGAGS on TV5 (Philippines).

One of her goals is to be an entrepreneur and someday open her own PR firm and/or boutique.

References

1982 births
American people of Cuban descent
American expatriates in the Philippines
Cuban beauty pageant winners
Cuban female models
Living people
Miss Earth 2007 contestants
People from Hartford, Connecticut